Berezniaky is a historical neighbourhood, on the left bank of Kyiv, the capital of Ukraine. Massive construction began there in 1971.

External links

 Березняки in Wiki-Encyclopedia Kyiv  

Neighborhoods in Kyiv